Gaius Junius Silanus (fl. 1st century BC) was a Roman Senator, who was consul in 17 BC as the colleague of Gaius Furnius.

Biography
The son of an otherwise unknown Gaius Junius Silanus, it is speculated that Junius Silanus was related to Marcus Junius Silanus (perhaps his cousin). Elected consul in 17 BC alongside Gaius Furnius, it has been postulated that he may have been a proconsular governor of Asia around 24/23 BC, but this has been challenged as highly unlikely. He may have been the biological father of Quintus Caecilius Metellus Creticus Silanus. Nothing further is known about his career.

References

Sources
Syme, Ronald, The Augustan Aristocracy (1986)]. Clarendon Press. 

1st-century BC Romans
1st-century Romans
Senators of the Roman Empire
Imperial Roman consuls
Junii Silani
Year of birth unknown
Year of death unknown